Chews Landing (or Chews) is an unincorporated community within Gloucester Township, in Camden County, New Jersey, United States.

Located near the Big Timber Creek, Chews Landing is named after Jeremiah Chew, a revolutionary officer. It is also home to St. John's Episcopal Church and Burying Ground; a historic church that was built in 1880 and added to the National Register of Historic Places in 1980.

References

Gloucester Township, New Jersey
Unincorporated communities in Camden County, New Jersey
Unincorporated communities in New Jersey